Ricardo Maurice Patton (born October 23, 1958) is an American college basketball coach who most recently served as senior advisor to the head men's basketball coach at Vanderbilt University. On March 9, 2011, NIU announced that Patton would not return as their head coach for the 2011–12 season, it is unclear whether he resigned or was fired. Prior to this, he was the head coach at the University of Colorado. He was hired as head coach for the Buffaloes on March 5, 1996, just days before the Big Eight Conference Tournament. Patton guided the Buffaloes to six postseason appearances.  On July 11, 2011 it was announced that Patton joined the University of Maryland Eastern Shore as an assistant coach.

Patton left UMES to become head coach at Central High School in Memphis, Tennessee. He became an assistant coach at the University of Denver in March 2016.

Head coaching record

College

References

External links
 Colorado profile

1958 births
Living people
American men's basketball coaches
American men's basketball players
Basketball coaches from Tennessee
Basketball players from Nashville, Tennessee
Belmont Bruins men's basketball players
College men's basketball head coaches in the United States
Colorado Buffaloes men's basketball coaches
High school basketball coaches in the United States
Little Rock Trojans men's basketball coaches
Maryland Eastern Shore Hawks men's basketball coaches
Middle Tennessee Blue Raiders men's basketball coaches
Northern Illinois Huskies men's basketball coaches
Sportspeople from Nashville, Tennessee
Tennessee State Tigers basketball coaches